Christie Serino Jr. (August 1, 1949 – October 15, 2012) was an American ice hockey coach who worked for various college and high school programs over a 32-year span. His career peaked as the head coach for Merrimack for seven seasons.

Career
Serino started his coaching career with Saugus High School in his home town of Saugus, Massachusetts, heading the program for seven seasons. In 1988 he became the bench boss for Northfield Mount Hermon School and remained there for three years before he accepted an offer to become an assistant coach at New Hampshire under Dick Umile. Serino served in that capacity until 1998 when he became the head coach for Merrimack. When he took over the program the Warriors had not had a winning season since joining Hockey East in 1989 and during his entire 7-year tenure that trend continued. Merrimack never finished above 7th place in the conference and lost every Hockey East tournament game they played. In his final season Serino had by far his worst record, going 1–22–1 in the conference and missing the tournament. Unconfirmed reports at the time asserted that the players on the team had asked Serino to resign as head coach, which he did do after the season, but not before he accepted a move back to the High School ranks, this time at Malden Catholic. Serino remained the head coach for Malden until his death in 2012 as a result of throat cancer, a disease he had been diagnosed with in 2001.

Head coaching record

College ice hockey

References

External links
 

1949 births
2012 deaths
American ice hockey coaches
Deaths from throat cancer
Merrimack Warriors  men's ice hockey coaches
New Hampshire Wildcats baseball coaches
New Hampshire Wildcats men's ice hockey coaches
High school ice hockey coaches in the United States
People from Saugus, Massachusetts
Sportspeople from Essex County, Massachusetts